The 2021 Quick Lane Bowl was a college football bowl game played on December 27, 2021, with kickoff at 11:00 a.m. EST, televised on ESPN. It was the 7th edition of the Quick Lane Bowl (after the 2020 edition was cancelled due to the COVID-19 pandemic), and was one of the 2021–22 bowl games concluding the 2021 FBS football season.  The game's title sponsor was Quick Lane tire and auto centers.

Teams
While the bowl had tie-ins with the Mid-American Conference (MAC) and the Big Ten Conference, the actual participants were from the MAC and Mountain West Conference (MWC). This was the first time that Western Michigan and Nevada ever played each other.

Western Michigan Broncos

Western Michigan finished their regular season with a 7–5 record (4–4 in MAC games). The Broncos won four of their first five games, then lost four of their final six. The team was 1-1 in games against ranked opponents, with a loss to #2 Michigan, and a shocking win over #12 Pitt.

Nevada Wolf Pack

Nevada finished their regular season with an 8–4 record (5–3 in Mountain West games). The Wolf Pack played to a 5–1 record in their first six games, then went 3–3 in their final six games. The team played one ranked opponent, losing by two points to San Diego State in mid-November. Following the regular season, head coach Jay Norvell, offensive coordinator Matt Mumme, and multiple other coaches left the Nevada program to take jobs at Colorado State. The team was coached by running backs/interim head coach Vai Taua.

Starting quarterback Carson Strong, who won back-to-back Mountain West Conference Offensive Player of the Year awards in 2020 and 2021, opted out of the game in order to prepare for the 2022 NFL Draft. Multiple other athletes, including starting wide receivers Tory Horton and Melquan Stovall, transferred to Colorado State to remain with Norvell and did not play in the game.

Game summary

Statistics

References

Externals links
Game statistics at statbroadcast.com

Quick Lane Bowl
Quick Lane Bowl
Western Michigan Broncos football bowl games
Nevada Wolf Pack football bowl games
Quick Lane Bowl
Quick Lane Bowl